The 2015–16 UNC Wilmington Seahawks women's basketball team represents the University of North Carolina Wilmington during the 2015–16 NCAA Division I women's basketball season. The Seahawks, led by fourth year head coach Adell Harris, play their home games at the Trask Coliseum and were members of the Colonial Athletic Association. They finished the season 7–23, 3–15 CAA play to finish in a tie for ninth place. They lost in the first round of the CAA women's tournament to College of Charleston.

Roster

Schedule

|-
!colspan=9 style="background:#006666; color:#FFFF66;"| Exhibition

|-
!colspan=9 style="background:#006666; color:#FFFF66;"| Non-conference regular season

|-
!colspan=9 style="background:#006666; color:#FFFF66;"| CAA regular season

|-
!colspan=9 style="background:#006666; color:#FFFF66;"| CAA Women's Tournament

See also
2015–16 UNC Wilmington Seahawks men's basketball team

References

UNC Wilmington Seahawks women's basketball seasons
Unc Wilmington